The Samsung Galaxy Note Edge is an Android phablet produced by Samsung Electronics. Unveiled during a Samsung press conference at IFA Berlin on September 3, 2014, alongside its sister, the Galaxy Note 4, it is distinguished by a display that curves across the right side of the device, which can be used as a sidebar to display application shortcuts, a virtual camera shutter button, notifications, and other information.

Development and release 
At the 2013 Consumer Electronics Show, Samsung presented "Youm"—concept prototypes for smartphones that incorporated flexible displays. One prototype had a screen curved along the right edge of the phone, while the other had a screen curved around the bottom of the phone. Samsung explained that the additional "strip" could be used to display additional information alongside apps, such as notifications or a news ticker.

The Youm concept would surface as part of the Galaxy Note Edge, which was unveiled alongside the Galaxy Note 4 on September 3, 2014. Samsung strategist Justin Denison explained that the company liked to take risks in its products, going on to say that "We're not a company that does one-offs [..] We like to do things big and get behind it."

Specifications

Hardware and design
The Galaxy Note Edge is similar in design to the Galaxy Note 4 (which is in turn an evolution of the Galaxy Note 3), with a metallic frame and a plastic leather rear cover. The device features either an Exynos 5 Octa 5433(South Korea Version) or Qualcomm Snapdragon 805 (International Version) system-on-chip, 3 GB of RAM, and 32 or 64 GB of expandable storage. As with other Galaxy Note series devices, it includes an S Pen stylus which can be used for pen input, drawing, and handwriting. The S Pen had been given a small upgrade with the Note Edge. Similarly to other recent Samsung flagship devices, it also includes a heart rate sensor and fingerprint scanner. The Galaxy Note Edge features a 5.6-inch "Quad HD+" Super AMOLED display, which contains an additional 160 pixel wide column that wraps around the side of the device on a curve. The device includes a 16 megapixel rear camera with a back-illuminated sensor, optical image stabilization, and 4K video recording, and a 3.7 megapixel front-facing camera.

Software
The Galaxy Note Edge ships with Android 4.4.4 "KitKat" and Samsung's TouchWiz interface and software suite, and is similar to that of the Note 4. The curved edge of the screen is used as a sidebar for various purposes: it can be used to display different panels, including shortcuts to frequent applications, displays of notifications, news, stocks, sports, social networks, playback controls for the music and video players, camera controls, data usage, and minigames. Tools are also available through the panel, including a ruler, stopwatch, timer, voice recorder, and flashlight button. A software development kit is available for developers to code panels; additional panels can be obtained through Galaxy Apps. The "Night Clock" mode allows the edge screen to, during a pre-determined timeframe, display a digital clock while not in use. Due to the nature of AMOLED displays, which render black by not turning on the pixel at all, this mode does not significantly consume battery power, but per software limitations it cannot be active for more than 12 hours at a time.

Variants 
Countries
 Europe: SM-N915FY
 Korea: N915K/N915L/N915S
 Singapore, Australia, Spain: N915G
 Japan: N915D
Carriers
 AT&T: N915A 
 T-Mobile: N915T

The Note Edge was shipped to Germany after more than 120.000 people voted for it in an online poll conducted by Samsung. A "Premium Edition" with the model number "N915FZKYDBT" was launched soon after, with more accessories in the box (flip cover, memory card, "display cleaner", and an additional brochure with usage tips), as well as an extended warranty.

References

External links 
 Official Website

Samsung smartphones
Android (operating system) devices
Samsung Galaxy
Edge
Mobile phones introduced in 2014
Mobile phones with stylus
Mobile phones with user-replaceable battery
Mobile phones with infrared transmitter
Mobile phones with 4K video recording